Joseph Abraham Houston (July 12, 1926 – December 28, 2015) was an American tenor saxophonist who played jazz and rhythm and blues.

Biography
He was born in Bastrop, a suburb of Austin, Texas, and studied trumpet in school, changing to saxophone later. As a teen he began emulating a touring band by buying a red suit with white pants. One night in 1941 a saxophone player did not show for a gig with the band and Houston took his place. Between 1943 and 1946, Houston toured with King Kolax's band through Kansas City and Chicago and throughout the Mid-West.

After World War II Houston returned to Texas, and recorded with the pianist Amos Milburn and singer Big Joe Turner.  Initially playing alto sax, he switched to tenor in the wake of such "honking" saxophonists as Big Jay McNeely and Paul Williams.  Turner got Houston his first recording contract on Freedom Records in 1949. Houston moved to Baton Rouge, Louisiana, and played with Betty Roche and Wynonie Harris.

Eventually, Houston formed his own band The Rockets, and moved to Los Angeles in 1952.  He scored his only two chart hit singles in 1952 with "Worry, Worry, Worry", and "Hard Time Baby" both of which peaked at #10 on Billboard's R&B singles chart.  He recorded for many record labels, including Modern and Crown, and contributed vocals as well as saxophone on some of his records.

Houston was based in Los Angeles throughout most of his career. He toured and recorded with his band the Defrosterz, started by the bassist Mark St. John, who acted as his bassist and manager almost 20 years, plus the keyboardist Mike Malone. They toured North America and recorded throughout the 1990s and 2000s.  The band was signed to the Shattered Records label.

Houston's musical career ended after he suffered a stroke in 2006. Joe returned to the stage in July 2008 and performed at The Long Beach lobster Festival. He continued to entertain until 2012 due to his health. He died on December 28, 2015, in Long Beach, California, following some health issues.

Singles

References

External links

Joe Houston discography scans of Houston's vinyl albums

1926 births
2015 deaths
Musicians from Austin, Texas
American jazz saxophonists
American male saxophonists
Imperial Records artists
Modern Records artists
RPM Records (United States) artists
Kent Records artists
Combo Records artists
Jump blues musicians
People from Bastrop, Texas
Jazz musicians from Texas
American male jazz musicians
20th-century American saxophonists